The Athletic Club 96 (sometimes known by sponsor names Athletic Club 96 Alperia) is an Italian athletics club based in Bolzano, founded in 1996, reigning Italian champion.

Achievements
Athletic Club 96 won two consecutive editions of the men's Italian Championships in Athletics for clubs (2019, 2020).

Main athletes
Below is the list of the main athletes in force at the Athletic Club 96 Alperia in 2021.

Antonio Infantino
Luca Lai
Brayan Lopez
Isalbet Juarez
Jacques Riparelli
Fabio Cerutti
Robert Grant
Leonardo Dei Tos

Antonino Trio

See also
Athletics in Italy

References

External links
 Athletic Club 96 at FIDAL 
 

Athletics clubs in Italy